Greece competed at the 2014 Summer Youth Olympics, in Nanjing, China from 16 August to 28 August 2014.

Medalists 
Medals awarded to participants of mixed-NOC (Combined) teams are represented in italics. These medals are not counted towards the individual NOC medal tally.

Athletics

Greece qualified six athletes.

Qualification Legend: Q=Final A (medal); qB=Final B (non-medal); qC=Final C (non-medal); qD=Final D (non-medal); qE=Final E (non-medal)

Boys
Field events

Girls
Track & road events

Field events

Cycling

Greece qualified a boys' team based on its ranking issued by the UCI.

Team

Mixed Relay

Fencing

Greece qualified three athletes based on its performance at the 2014 FIE Cadet World Championships.

Boys

Girls

Mixed Team

Gymnastics

Artistic Gymnastics

Greece qualified one athlete based on its performance at the 2014 European MAG Championships and another athlete based on its performance at the 2014 European WAG Championships.

Boys

Girls

Rowing

Greece qualified two boats based on its performance at the 2013 World Rowing Junior Championships.

Qualification Legend: FA=Final A (medal); FB=Final B (non-medal); FC=Final C (non-medal); FD=Final D (non-medal); SA/B=Semifinals A/B; SC/D=Semifinals C/D; R=Repechage

Sailing

Greece qualified one boat based on its performance at the Byte CII European Continental Qualifiers.

Shooting

Greece qualified one shooter based on its performance at the 2014 European Shooting Championships.

Individual

Team

Swimming

Greece qualified four swimmers.

Boys

Girls

References

2014 in Greek sport
Nations at the 2014 Summer Youth Olympics
Greece at the Youth Olympics